The 2013 United States Women's Curling Championship was held from February 9 to 16 at the Cornerstone Community Center in Green Bay, Wisconsin. It was held in conjunction with the 2013 United States Men's Curling Championship. The winning team will represent the United States at the 2013 World Women's Curling Championship in Riga, Latvia. The championship  also acted as a qualifier to the 2014 United States Olympic Curling Trials, awarding a qualifying spot to the winners of the championship.

Road to the Nationals

A total of ten teams will be able to participate in the women's national championship by qualifying through the High Performance Program, through the World Curling Tour Order of Merit, or through a challenge round.

Teams
There will be ten teams participating in this year's national championship. The teams are to be announced.

Notes
  Roessler is filling in for Potter, who is out on maternity leave.

Round robin standings
Final round robin standings

Round robin results
All draw times are listed in Central Standard Time (UTC−6).

Draw 1
Saturday, February 9, 4:30 pm

Draw 2
Sunday, February 10, 8:00 am

Draw 3
Sunday, February 10, 4:00 pm

Draw 4
Monday, February 11, 8:00 am

Draw 5
Monday, February 11, 4:00 pm

Draw 6
Tuesday, February 12, 9:00 am

Draw 7
Tuesday, February 12, 7:00 pm

Draw 8
Wednesday, February 13, 12:00 pm

Draw 9
Wednesday, February 13, 8:00 pm

Tiebreaker
Thursday, February 14, 12:00 pm

Playoffs

Semifinals
Thursday, February 14, 8:00 pm

Bronze medal game
Friday, February 15, 2:00 pm

Final
Saturday, February 16, 9:00 am

References

External links

USA Curling Home

Women's curling competitions in the United States
United States National Curling Championships
Curling in Wisconsin
United States Women's Curling Championship
United States Women's Curling Championship
United States Women's Curling Championship